Pašticada is a braised beef dish cooked in a fragrant sweet and sour sauce, popular in Croatia. It is often called Dalmatinska pašticada because it originates in Dalmatia, where it is served at festivities and gatherings. The meal requires long and meticulous preparation. The meat, usually a whole eye of round, is pierced and stuffed with garlic, cloves, carrot and bacon, and marinated in wine vinegar overnight. It is then seared and simmered with onions, parsley root, prunes, wine and sweet prošek wine for several hours. The meat is cut into thick slices and additionally cooked in the resulting sauce.  

Pašticada is usually served with gnocchi or homemade pasta.

History
The origins of pašticada are not entirely known. The oldest recorded recipe is from Dubrovnik, dating from the fifteenth century.

References

Croatian cuisine
Beef dishes